Marius Descamps (16 June 1924 – 20 February 1996) was a French entomologist, specialist of orthoptera at the Museum National d'Histoire Naturelle in Paris.

Works 
Published Recherches morphologiques et biologiques sur les Diopsidae du Nord Cameroun.

References 

 

1924 births
1996 deaths
French entomologists
National Museum of Natural History (France) people
20th-century French zoologists